Chamagne is a commune in the Vosges department in Grand Est in northeastern France.

Notable people 
 Alice Jouenne (1873-1954), teacher and socialist activist
 Claude Lorrain (1600–1682), painter, draughtsman and etcher of the Baroque era.

See also
Communes of the Vosges department

References

External links

 Official website of Chamagne

Communes of Vosges (department)